Archie N. Romines, Sr. (born c. 1930) was an American politician in the state of Kentucky. He served in the Kentucky House of Representatives as a Democrat from 1973 to 1982.

References

Living people
Democratic Party members of the Kentucky House of Representatives
1930s births
People from Metcalfe County, Kentucky
People from Meade County, Kentucky
20th-century American politicians